Audrey Wood (born August 12, 1948) is an American children's author.  Wood resides in Santa Barbara, California.

Biography 

Wood's first memories of storytelling were in Sarasota, Florida, where her father was employed by Ringling Brothers Circus, commissioned to repaint the big top and sideshow murals. As Audrey became friends with the characters of the circus, she heard stories about them from the family of "little people" who lived next door to her family. She was the first of three girls. As the oldest, she began her gift of storytelling with her younger sisters. She would use her parents' art books and make up stories about the paintings. By the time she was in fourth grade, her ambition was to become an author/illustrator.

Wood uses children's literature to practice art, music, drama, dance, and writing. Her work creates a sense of imagination and excitement. She loves step-and-repeat stories for the "music of language". An example of this would be her famous book, The Napping House.

Her husband, Don, is the illustrator of many of her books, including King Bidgood's in the Bathtub, which received a Caldecott Honor.  They began collaborating on children's literature seven years after their marriage, their first book together entitled Moonflute. Since its publication, Don has illustrated nearly 20 of her books. Their son, Bruce Robert Wood, was also an illustrator, which makes art a five generation tradition in the family.

In an interview conducted by publisher Harcourt with them, Wood was congratulated on her success in publishing children's literature. The Napping House was being celebrated for its twentieth year in publication. Being asked how writing evolved her relationship with Don, she responded, "I read him a children's book during our honeymoon." She also said that even though always interested in children's books is wasn't until Bruce was born that she was pushed into action. Don did not care for the illustrations in her first book when it was published in England, and he did the illustrations in her book Moonflute when it was published in the United States. He has been hooked on illustrating children's books ever since.

Works 

 Alphabet Adventure (illustrated by Bruce Wood)
 Alphabet Mystery (illustrated by Bruce Wood)
 Alphabet Rescue (illustrated by Bruce Wood)
 Balloonia
 Birdsong (illustrated by Robert Florczak)
 The Birthday Queen (illustrated by Don and Audrey Wood)
 Blue Sky
 A Book for Honey Bear: Reading Keeps the Sighs Away (illustrated by Bruce Wood)
 Bright and Early Thursday Evening: A Tangled Tale (illustrated by Don Wood)
 The Bunyans (illustrated by David Shannon)
 The Deep Blue Sea (illustrated by Bruce Wood)
 Detective Valentine
 A Dog Needs a Bone!
 Elbert's Bad Word (illustrated by Don and Audrey Wood)
 The Flying Dragon Room (illustrated by Mark Teague)
 The Full Moon at the Napping House (illustrated by Don Wood)
 Heckedy Peg (illustrated by Don Wood)
 It's Duffy Time! (illustrated by Don Wood)
 Jubal's Wish (illustrated by Don Wood)
 King Bidgood's in the Bathtub (illustrated by Don Wood)
 The Little Mouse, The Red Ripe Strawberry, and The Big Hungry Bear (co-authored by Don Wood, illustrated by Don Wood)
 Little Penguin's Tale
 Magic Shoelaces
 Moonflute (illustrated by Don Wood)
 The Napping House (illustrated by Don Wood)
 Oh My Baby Bear
 Orlando's Little While Friends
 Piggies (co-authored by Don Wood, illustrated by Don Wood)
 Piggy Pie-Po (illustrated by Don Wood)
 Presto Change-O
 The Princess and the Dragon
 Quick as a Cricket (illustrated by Don Wood)
 The Rainbow Bridge (illustrated by Robert Florczak)
 The Red Racer
 Rude Giants
 Scaredy Cats
 Silly Sally
 Sweet Dream Pie (illustrated by Mark Teague)
 Ten Little Fish (illustrated by Bruce Wood)
 Three Sisters, illustrated by Rosekrans Hoffman
 The Tickle-Octopus (illustrated by Don Wood)
 The Tooth Fairy
 Tugford Wanted to Be Bad
 Twenty-Four Robbers
 Weird Parents
 When the Root Children Wake Up, illustrated by Ned Bittinger

Holiday books 
 The Christmas Adventure of Space Elf Sam (illustrated by Bruce Wood)
 A Cowboy Christmas: The Miracle at Lone Pine Ridge (illustrated by Robert Florczak)
 The Horrible Holidays, illustrated by Rosekrans Hoffman
 Merry Christmas, Big Hungry Bear (illustrated by Don Wood)

References

External links

 Interview with Audrey and Don Wood at Harcourt Trade Publishers

1948 births
American children's writers
Writers from Little Rock, Arkansas
Living people